Emilio Sosa (born February 23, 1967) is a costume designer for Broadway and is the current Chair for the American Theatre Wing Board of Trustees in New York City. He is a Tony Award nominated costume designer and is best known for his works Topdog/Underdog, Porgy and Bess, and By the Way, Meet Vera Stark.

Early life 
Emilio Sosa was born in Santo Domingo, Dominican Republic and grew up in South Bronx, New York City. His interest in fashion and design started at the age of 14. While attending school in Harlem, he spent his afternoons taking art and design classes at Manhattan's Upper East Side. Additionally, he took free classes Saturdays at Parsons School of Design in Greenwich Village. He continued his passion for fashion design by attending Art and Design High School and Pratt Institute.

Career

Early career 
While attending Pratt Institute, Emilio worked a part-time job at Grace Costumes as a shopper and eventually became its Creative Director in 2006. His first design job out of college was as an assistant costume master for the Alvin Ailey Dance Company, touring domestically and internationally.

He made a name for himself by styling music videos for Hip Hop artists, such as Salt-N-Pepa, MC Lyte, and Kid Play. He later became an in-house stylist for director Spike Lee as an assistant costume designer on his films Bamboozled and Red Hook Summer.

Broadway / National Success 
Discovered by director George C. Wolfe, Emilio designed his first Broadway show, Topdog/Underdog. He continued to work on shows designed by Ann Hould-Ward, Geoffery Holder, Desmond Heely, Toni Leslie James, and Paul Tazewell. As well as going on tour as a designer for Celine Dion, The Alvin Ailey Dance Company, and the Lincoln Center with Wynton Marsalis.

In 2010, Emilio Sosa then went onto Season 7 of Project Runway, winning 5 challenges and being runner up in the finale episode. In 2012, he was runner up for Project Runway Allstars. He then went on to co-create the fashion line, Esosa Designs, with his brothers. Celebrities seen wearing Esosa Designs include Wendy Williams, Taraji P. Henson, and Uzo Aduba.

Honors & recognition 
Emilio was the first designer of color to design the Radio City Music Hall Spring Spectacular and a new number in the 2018 Christmas show, starring The Rockettes. 

In 2005, he received the Helen Hayes Award for Outstanding Costume Design, Resident Production for the musical, Señor Discretion Himself. He was announced as the 2003 Design Virtuoso in the American Theatre Magazine. His costume design work on By the Way, Meet Vera Stark received the Henry Hewes Award in 2011 and Lucille Lortel Award. He was also awarded the LA Ovation Award for the musical Twist, the 2006 Irene Sharaff Young Master Award, and the 2015 NAACP Theatre Awards for the musical Porgy and Bess. 

He has been nominated for a Tony Award in 2012 for Best Costume Design in a Musical for Porgy and Bess, Best Costume Design in a Play for Trouble in Mind, and the 2004 NAACP Theatre Award for Best Costume Design for Topdog/Underdog. Emilio Sosa now sits as the Chair for the Board of Trustees for the American Theatre Wing.

List of works

Plays 

 Topdog/Underdog
 Lady Day at Emerson's Bar and Grill
 By the Way, Meet Vera Stark
 Venus
 Crowns
 Trust
 Romeo and Juliet
 The Misanthrope
 Sex with Strangers
 White Card
 Ma Rainey's Black Bottom 
 Ruined
 Twist
 Fences
 Skeleton Crew
 Frost/Nixon
 Artney Jackson
 Seize the King
 Sweat
 Eve's Song
 Man in the Ring
 The Light
 Do You Feel Anger?
 Much Ado About Nothing
 The Way She Spoke
 Make Believe
 The Hot Wing King
 72 Miles To Go
 Trouble in Mind (Tony Award Nomination)

Musicals 

 ON YOUR FEET!
 ExtraOrdinary
 MOTOWN: The Musical
 Porgy and Bess (Tony Award Nomination)
 Me and My Girl
 Invisible Thread
 The Capeman
 Señor Discretion Himself
 Miss You Like Hell
 The Scottsboro Boys
 Shout Sister Shout!

Other performances / Film 

 The Rockettes - 2018 Christmas Show
 Red Hook Summer
 Radio City New York Spectacular
 New York Knicks City Dancers

List of Theatres Worked For 

 Mark Taper Forum Theatre
 Long Wharf Theatre
 The American Repertory Theatre Production
 Ahmanson Theatre
 Geffen Playhouse
 Arena Stage
 Goodman Theatre
 McCarter Theater
 Roundabout Theatre Company

Appearances 

 Working in the Theatre - Costumes - 2015
 Behind the Scenes Show: The Tony Awards - 2016
 Live from the Red Carpet: The 2016 Tony Awards
 Live from the Red Carpet: The 2015 Tony Awards
 Project Runway All Stars - 2012-2014
 Project Runway Season 7 - 2010

References

American costume designers
American fashion designers
People from Santo Domingo
People from the Bronx
Parsons School of Design alumni
Pratt Institute alumni
High School of Art and Design alumni
1967 births
Living people
Project Runway (American series) participants